Ephemera is a genus of mayfly in the family Ephemeridae. It contains the following species:

References
Catalogue of Life
Fauna europaea
ITIS

Mayflies
Mayfly genera
Taxa named by Carl Linnaeus